Grantaire  is a fictional character from the 1862 novel Les Misérables by Victor Hugo. He is a student from the South of France and is one of the principal characters of the revolutionary group known as the Friends of the ABC. According to the novel, the Friends of the ABC only tolerate him because of his good humour. He often signs with his rebus: R and, at one point, Bossuet calls him "Capital R." He is a gambler and often drunk.

Description

Physical appearance
Grantaire is not physically attractive; he is described as "particularly ugly" or "inordinately homely," Contrastingly, Enjolras is described as having "...long fair lashes, blue eyes, that hair flying in the wind, rosy cheeks, pure lips, exquisite teeth".

Morality
Grantaire is a skeptic, believing in nothing, claiming to know nothing, with no values or goals. He takes little interest in the cause of the revolutionary students and is described in the novel as someone who was able to go along without any particular belief. His veneration, love, and admiration for Enjolras is the main reason that Grantaire spends time with Friends of the ABC, despite Enjolras's scorn for his scepticism.  Grantaire is the one in the group who knows the best places for everything in Paris and also about boxing, foot-fencing, and some dances.

Narrative
Grantaire plays a very small role in planning the fictitious June Rebellion. He is not an official member of the Friends of the ABC but is always present, usually intoxicated. He stays because of his admiration, love, and veneration for Enjolras. It is suggested in the text that Grantaire's love for Enjolras is romantic in nature, although this is never explicitly stated. Enjolras and Grantaire are compared to Orestes and Pylades as one cannot not come without the other. However, this is not an indication of any particular friendship or admiration from Enjolras' perspective. Enjolras is offended by Grantaire's nonchalance to their cause, on one occasion telling him not to "meddle in [the L'ABC's] affairs". Grantaire is used as the narrative foil of Enjolras. On the day of the rebellion, Grantaire is unconscious from drink and wakes up only when Enjolras is about to be executed. Grantaire walked in front of the firing squad calling, "Vive la République," or "Long Live the Republic," and dies hand in hand with him.

Adaptions 

Grantaire appears in many adaptions of Les Misérables, including the musical.

In the 2012 film version of the musical, the character is played by George Blagden.

He is played by Turlough Convery in the 2018 BBC miniseries

References

Les Misérables characters
Fictional revolutionaries
Fictional French people
Literary characters introduced in 1862